Abre (English: Open) is the eight solo studio album and tenth overall by Argentine singer Fito Páez, released on July 27, 1999, through Warner Music Argentina. It was produced by Phil Ramone.

At the 1st Annual Latin Grammy Awards, the album was nominated for Best Rock Album while the song "Al Lado del Camino" was nominated for Song of the Year and won Best Rock Song and Best Male Rock Vocal Performance, Frank Filipetti also received a nomination for Best Engineered Album for his work as engineer and mixer in the album. Additionally, the album was nominated for Best Latin Rock/Alternative Album at the 43rd Annual Grammy Awards, being Páez first Grammy Award nomination, and only until his win for La Conquista del Espacio in 2021 in the same category. Abre was also nominated for Album of the Year at the Premios Gardel in 2000 while Phil Ramone was nominated for Producer of the Year for his work in the album.

The album was certified platinum in Argentina in 2000 after selling over 40,000 copies.

Background
The album was recorded at Circo Beat Studios and was the first solo album by Páez since Circo Beat, released in 1994, prior to Abre, Páez worked in Enemigos Íntimos, a collaborative album with Spanish musician Joaquín Sabina. Abre was premiered at Teatro Maipo in Buenos Aires, Argentina, where Páez performed the songs from the album alongside musicians such as Guillermo Vadalá, Nicolás Ibarburu, Gonzalo Aloras, Claudio Cardone, Emmanuel Cauvet, Carlos Huerta, Juan Larrinaga and Adrián Elizarde. To promote the album, Páez embarked on a tour through Argentina that started on August 21, 1999, in Rosario, Santa Fe, his hometown, and included a concert at Teatro Gran Rex in Buenos Aires.

Critical reception

Iván Adaime from AllMusic gave the album three out of five stars calling it a "sophisticated and lushly arranged pop album", he also highlighted the title track as one of the memorable moments from the album, he finished the review writing that "apart from El Amor Después del Amor and Tercer Mundo, Abre is the best album recorded by Páez in the '90s".

Track listing
All tracks were written by Fito Páez and producer by Phil Ramone.

Credits

Musicians
 Fito Páez – composition, arrangements, vocals, piano, keyboards
 Claudio Cardone – arrangements (track 3), keyboards
 Rob Mounsey – arrangements (tracks 3, 9)
 Rob Mathes – arrangements (tracks 4, 5, 10)
 Guillermo Vidalá – arrangements (track 5), bass, guitar, keyboards
 Lucho González – arrangements (track 6), guitar
 Anita Alvarez de Toledo – backing vocals (tracks 1, 8)
 Néstor Marconi – bandoneon (track 5)
 Shawn Pelton – drums, loop
 Gabriel Carambula – guitar
 Ulises Butrón – guitar
 Ube Reyes – percussion (track 6)

Technical
 Phil Ramone – producer
 Frank Filipetti – engineer, mixing
 Ted Jensen – mastering
 Brian Garten – assistant engineer
 Marcelo Infante – assistant engineer
 Mariano Rodríguez – assistant engineer
 Alejandro Ros – design
 Eduardo Martí – photography

References

1999 albums
Warner Music Latina albums